Events from the year 1709 in Ireland.

Incumbent
Monarch: Anne

Events
August 30 – the Parliament of Ireland passes an amending act which requires any adult male (including registered Roman Catholic priests) to take an oath of abjuration if required by a magistrate.
September 4–8 – nearly 800 poor Protestant refugee families of German Palatines arrive in Dublin to be settled in Ireland.
c. December – start of Hougher disturbances against the extension of livestock rearing in Connacht including maiming of cattle.

Births
October 13 – John Cole, 1st Baron Mountflorence, politician (d. 1767)
Robert Nugent, 1st Earl Nugent, politician (d. 1788)
 Approximate date – Laetitia Pilkington, born Laetitia van Lewen, poet and memoirist (d. 1750)

Deaths
August 31 (September 11 NS) – Sir Thomas Prendergast, 1st Baronet, soldier, killed at the Battle of Malplaquet (b. c. 1660)

References

 
Years of the 18th century in Ireland
Ireland
1700s in Ireland